The tributary system of China, or Cefeng system was a network of loose international relations centered around China which facilitated trade and foreign relations by acknowledging China's predominant role within a Sinocentric world order. It involved multiple relationships of trade, military force, diplomacy and ritual. The other states had to send a tributary envoy to China on schedule, who would kowtow to the Chinese emperor as a form of tribute, and acknowledge his superiority and precedence. The other countries followed China's formal ritual in order to keep the peace with the more powerful neighbor and be eligible for diplomatic or military help under certain conditions. Political actors within the tributary system were largely autonomous and in almost all cases virtually independent.

Definition

The term "tribute system", strictly speaking, is a Western invention. There was no equivalent term in the Chinese lexicon to describe what would be considered the "tribute system" today, nor was it envisioned as an institution or system. John King Fairbank and Teng Ssu-yu created the "tribute system" theory in a series of articles in the early 1940s to describe "a set of ideas and practices developed and perpetuated by the rulers of China over many centuries." The Fairbank model presents the tribute system as an extension of the hierarchic and nonegalitarian Confucian social order. The more Confucian the actors, the more likely they were to participate in the tributary system.

In practice

The "tribute system" is often associated with a "Confucian world order", under which neighboring states complied and participated in the "tribute system" to secure guarantees of peace, investiture, and trading opportunities. One member acknowledged another's position as superior, and the superior would bestow investiture upon them in the form of a crown, official seal, and formal robes, to confirm them as king.  The practice of investing non-Chinese neighbors had been practiced since ancient times as a concrete expression of the loose reign policy. The rulers of Joseon, in particular, sought to legitimize their rule through reference to Chinese symbolic authority. On the opposite side of the tributary relationship spectrum was Japan, whose leaders could hurt their own legitimacy by identifying with Chinese authority. In these politically tricky situations, sometimes a false king was set up to receive investiture for the purposes of tribute trade. 

In practice, the tribute system only became formalized during the early years of the Ming dynasty. The "tribute" entailed a foreign court sending envoys and exotic products to the Chinese emperor. The emperor then gave the envoys gifts in return and permitted them to trade in China. Presenting tribute involved theatrical subordination but usually not political subordination. The political sacrifice of participating actors was simply "symbolic obeisance". Actors within the "tribute system" were virtually autonomous and carried out their own agendas despite sending tribute; as was the case with Japan, Korea, Ryukyu, and Vietnam. Chinese influence on tributary states was almost always non-interventionist in nature and tributary states "normally could expect no military assistance from Chinese armies should they be invaded". For example, when the Hongwu Emperor learned that the Vietnamese attacked Champa, he only rebuked them, and did not intervene in the 1471 Vietnamese invasion of Champa, which resulted in the destruction of that country. Both Vietnam and Champa were tributary states. When the Malacca sultanate sent envoys to China in 1481 to inform them that while returning to Malacca in 1469 from a trip to China, the Vietnamese had attacked them, castrating the young and enslaving them, China still did not interfere with affairs in Vietnam. The Malaccans reported that Vietnam was in control of Champa and also that the Vietnamese sought to conquer Malacca, but the Malaccans did not fight back because of a lack of permission from the Chinese to engage in war. The Ming emperor scolded them, ordering the Malaccans to strike back with violent force if the Vietnamese attacked.

According to a 2018 study in the Journal of Conflict Resolution covering Vietnam-China relations from 1365 to 1841, "the Vietnamese court explicitly recognized its unequal status in its relations with China through a number of institutions and norms." Due to their participation in the tributary system, Vietnamese rulers behaved as though China was not a threat and paid very little military attention to it. Rather, Vietnamese leaders were clearly more concerned with quelling chronic domestic instability and managing relations with kingdoms to their south and west."

Nor were states that sent tribute forced to mimic Chinese institutions, for example in cases such as the Inner Asians, who basically ignored the trappings of Chinese government. Instead they manipulated Chinese tribute practices for their own financial benefit. The gifts doled out by the Ming emperor and the trade permits granted were of greater value than the tribute itself, so tribute states sent as many tribute missions as they could. In 1372, the Hongwu Emperor restricted tribute missions from Joseon and six other countries to just one every three years. The Ryukyu Kingdom was not included in this list, and sent 57 tribute missions from 1372 to 1398, an average of two tribute missions per year. Since geographical density and proximity was not an issue, regions with multiple kings such as the Sultanate of Sulu benefited immensely from this exchange. This also caused odd situations such as the Turpan Khanate simultaneously raiding Ming territory and offering tribute at the same time because they were eager to obtain the emperor's gifts, which were given in the hope that it might stop the raiding.

Participation in a tributary relationship with a Chinese dynasty could also be predicated on cultural or civilizational motivations rather than material and monetary benefits. The Korean kingdom of Joseon did not treat the Manchu-led Qing dynasty, which invaded Joseon and forced it to become a tributary in 1636, in the same way as the Han-led Ming dynasty. Joseon had continued to support the Ming in their wars against the Qing despite incurring military retaliation from the latter. The Manchus were viewed as barbarians by the Korean court, which, regarding itself as the new "Confucian ideological center" in place of the Ming, continued to use the Ming calendar and era names in defiance of the Qing, despite sending tribute missions. Meanwhile, Japan avoided direct contact with Qing China and instead manipulated embassies from neighboring Joseon and Ryukyu to make it falsely appear as though they came to pay tribute. Joseon Korea remained a tributary of Qing China until 1895, when the First Sino-Japanese War ended this relationship.

Rituals
The Chinese tributary system required a set of rituals from the tributary states whenever they sought relations with China as a way of regulating diplomatic relations. The main rituals generally included:
The sending of missions by tributary states to China
The tributary envoys' kowtowing before the Chinese emperor as "a symbolic recognition of their inferiority" and "acknowledgment of their status of a vassal state
The presentation of tribute and receipt of the emperor's "vassals' gifts"
The investiture of the tributary state's ruler as the legitimate king of his land
After the completion of the rituals, the tributary states engaged in their desired business, such as trade.

History 

Tributary relations emerged during the Tang dynasty as Chinese rulers started perceiving foreign envoys bearing tribute as a "token of conformity to the Chinese world order".

The Ming founder Hongwu Emperor adopted a maritime prohibition policy and issued tallies to "tribute-bearing" embassies for missions. Missions were subject to limits on the number of persons and items allowed.

Korea

Jinhan and Mahan were recorded paying tribute to the Jin dynasty of China from 280 AD repeatedly in the Book of Jin.

The Records of the Three Kingdoms recorded Goguryeo sent envoys to the Han dynasty with tributes to Emperor Guangwu of Han as a principality state in 30 AD. Goguryeo continued to pay tribute to the proceeding Chinese dynasties: Jin dynasty, Northern Wei, Northern Zhou, Sui dynasty, and Tang dynasty.

Baekje was first recorded sending tribute to Northern Wei in the Book of Wei. Baekje sent tribute to the Jin dynasty in 372 AD, recorded in the Book of Jin. It is recorded in the Book of Sui that after the Sui dynasty's founding, Wideok of Baekje sent envoys and tributes to Emperor Wen of Sui. Later, when Sui dynasty was conquering the Chen dynasty, a warship floated to Tamna; on its way back, the ship passed by Baekje, and the King Wideok sent sufficient supplies to the crew along with an envoy to send congratulations for defeating the Chen dynasty to Emperor Wen. Emperor Wen was touched and issued an imperial edict to exempt Baekje's yearly tribute. However, Baekje still sent tributes to Sui dynasty to plea for war against Goguryeo in 598 AD and 607 AD. In 614 AD, Baekje sent last tribute to the Sui dynasty before Sui's fall in 619 AD. Baekje started to send tribute to the Tang dynasty in 622 AD.

Silla was recorded sending tribute to the Sui dynasty in 594 AD by the order of Jinpyeong of Silla, and then Silla started to send tribute yearly from 605 AD. The Old Book of Tang and New Book of Tang recorded Silla sending women (4 in total; all rejected), gold, silver among other things as tribute to the Tang dynasty.

Goryeos rulers called themselves "Great King" viewing themselves as the sovereigns of the Goryeo-centered world of Northeast Asia. They maintained their own Imperial style, in their setup of government institutions, administrative divisions and own tributary system. 

As the struggle between the Northern Yuan and the Red Turban Rebellion and the Ming remained indecisive, Goryeo retained neutrality despite both sides pleading for their assistance in order to break this stalemate. As the Ming eventually gained the upper hand Goryeo paid an enormous tribute to Ming in February 1385 consisting of five thousand horses, five hundred jin of gold, fifty thousand jin of silver and fifty thousand bolts of cotton fabric order to maintain their neutrality.

Japan
Early kings of Japan had formal diplomatic inquiries with the Jin dynasty and its subsequent successors and were appointed as "King of Wa". The Emperors of China commonly referred to the ruler of Japan as 倭寇王 wōkouwang (wakuō) meaning "King of Wa", while they themselves styled themselves as ōkimi, meaning "Great King" in relation to the Chinese emperor. Internally 天皇 tennō meaning "heavenly king" also used to put the ruler of Japan on the same level as the one of China.

In 1404, Shogun Ashikaga Yoshimitsu, who held most of the de facto power in Japan, accepted the title "King of Japan", despite the nominal sovereign of Japan still residing in Kyōto. Yoshimitsu was the first and only Japanese ruler in the early modern period to accept a Chinese title. During the Muromachi period Japan accepted the Ming led worldview, but this relationship ended in 1549 when Japan chose to end its recognition of China's regional hegemony and cancel any further tribute missions.  Membership in the tributary system was a prerequisite for any economic exchange with China; in exiting the system, Japan relinquished its trade relationship with China. Under the rule of the Wanli Emperor, Ming China quickly interpreted the Japanese invasions of Korea (1592–1598) as a challenge to the Ming centered predominant worldview and order.

Thailand
Thailand was subordinate to China as a vassal or tributary state from the Sui dynasty until the Taiping Rebellion of the late Qing dynasty in the mid-19th century. The Sukhothai Kingdom, the first unified Thai state, established official tributary relations with the Yuan dynasty during the reign of  King Ram Khamhaeng, and Thailand remained a tributary of China until 1853. Wei Yuan, the 19th century Chinese scholar, considered Thailand to be the strongest and most loyal of China's Southeast Asian tributaries, citing the time when Thailand offered to directly attack Japan to divert the Japanese in their planned invasions of Korea and the Asian mainland, as well as other acts of loyalty to the Ming dynasty. Thailand was welcoming and open to Chinese immigrants, who dominated commerce and trade, and achieved high positions in the government.

Vietnam
Vietnam was ruled by China for 1050 years. When Vietnam gained independence in 938, it became a tributary of China until 1885 when it became a protectorate of France with the Treaty of Huế (1884). The Lê dynasty (1428–1527) and Nguyễn dynasty (18021945) adopted the imperial Chinese system, with rulers declaring themselves emperors on the Confucian model and attempting to create a Vietnamese imperial tributary system while still remaining a tributary state of China.

Ryukyu Kingdom
From the late 14th to early 16th centuries, the Ryukyu Kingdom served an important position in the Ming's tributary order, as they became a key intermediary for the Ming's trade with Northeast and Southeast Asia through goods funnelled into Ming-Ryukyu tribute missions. Ryukyu's intermediary role was also facilitated by Chinese diaspora communities who settled in Ryukyu and served positions in the Ryukyu court.

Maritime Southeast Asia
The Sultanate of Malacca and the Sultanate of Brunei sent tribute to the Ming dynasty, with their first rulers personally traveling to China with the Imperial fleets.

See also 
 Emperor of China
 List of recipients of tribute from China
 List of tributary states of China
 Ming dynasty
 Tian ("Heaven") / Shangdi ("God")
 Tianxia ("All Under Heaven")
 Tian Chao ("Dynasty of Heaven")
 Tian Kehan ("Khan of Heaven")
 Tian Ming ("Mandate of Heaven")
 Tianzi ("Son of Heaven")
 Pax Sinica Tributary state
 Emperor at home, king abroad
 East Asian cultural sphere
 Little China (ideology)
 Mandala (political model)

 References 
 Citations 

 Sources 

 
 
 
 
 
 

Further reading

 Cohen, Warren I. . East Asia at the Center : Four Thousand Years of Engagement with the World. (New York: Columbia University Press,  2000. .
 Fairbank, John K., and Ssu-yu Teng. "On the Ch'ing tributary system." Harvard journal of Asiatic studies 6.2 (1941): 135–246. online
 Kang, David C., et al. "War, Rebellion, and Intervention under Hierarchy: Vietnam–China Relations, 1365 to 1841." Journal of Conflict Resolution 63.4 (2019): 896–922. online
 Kang, David C. "International Order in Historical East Asia: Tribute and Hierarchy Beyond Sinocentrism and Eurocentrism." International Organization (2019): 1-29. DOI: https://doi.org/10.1017/S0020818319000274
 

 Swope, Kenneth M. "Deceit, Disguise, and Dependence: China, Japan, and the Future of the Tributary System, 1592–1596." International History Review 24.4 (2002): 757–782.

 Wills, John E.  Past and Present in China's Foreign Policy: From "Tribute System" to "Peaceful Rise". (Portland, ME: MerwinAsia,  2010. .
 Womack, Brantly. "Asymmetry and China's tributary system." Chinese Journal of International Politics 5.1 (2012): 37–54. online
 Zhang, Yongjin, and Barry Buzan. "The tributary system as international society in theory and practice." Chinese Journal of International Politics'' 5.1 (2012): 3-36.

Chinese inventions
Classical Chinese philosophy
Foreign relations of Imperial China
History of Imperial China
History of East Asia